Tamworth Co-operative Society Limited is a small independent consumer co-operative in Tamworth, Staffordshire, England. The co-operative operates a department store, supermarket, 11 convenience stores, and eight funeral care locations, with over 20,000 members and an annual turnover in excess of £23m.

Arising from a sense of fair play, a meeting was held at the Victoria Road schoolroom in Tamworth on 13 November 1886, where it was proposed that "a co-operative society be formed in Tamworth". The motion was unanimously carried and the society began trading from a modest rented cottage on 10 December. On 15 March 1887 the society was legally incorporated as the Tamworth Industrial Co-operative Society Limited. The co-operative celebrated its centenary in 1986, when membership passed the 35,000 mark. In 2021 the society announced plans to close its department store, with it being turned into a business centre and college.

As a consumer co-operative the society is owned by its members, who are both customers and shareholders. Through the co-operative principle of one member one vote the society is governed by a member-elected board of directors alongside annual general meetings. The society is a member of Co-operatives UK, The Co-operative Group and the Federal Retail and Trading Services food buying group.

See also
British co-operative movement

References

External links
Tamworth Co-operative Society

Consumers' co-operatives of the United Kingdom
Department stores of the United Kingdom
Funeral-related companies of the United Kingdom
Retail companies established in 1886
Tamworth, Staffordshire